Nancy Skinner (born August 12, 1954) is an American politician and a member of the California State Senate. A Democrat, she represents California's 9th State Senate district, encompassing the East Bay.

Prior to her election to the State Senate in 2016, Skinner was a member of the California State Assembly representing California's 15th State Assembly district from 2008 to 2014. She also served as a member of the East Bay Regional Park Board, representing Ward 1 from 2006 to 2008. Skinner was a member of the Berkeley City Council from 1984 to 1992; she remains the only student ever elected to the Berkeley City Council. She had previously founded and worked for several non-profit groups on global warming and other issues related to environmental policy.

Early political career
Skinner attended the University of California, Berkeley, and earned both a B.S. from the U.C. Berkeley College of Natural Resources and a Masters in Education from the U.C. Berkeley School of Education. As a student, she was a leader in the Anti-Apartheid Movement, served as the Academic Affairs Vice President of the ASUC, the student government, and was a founder of ASGE, the Union of Graduate Student Employees. Skinner later taught courses in native California plants and interned at the Golden Gate National Recreation Area.

Skinner was elected to the Berkeley City Council while still a student and served from 1984 to 1992. She remains the only student ever elected to the City Council. During her time on the council, she helped establish McLaughlin Eastshore State Park, pushed for Berkeley to become the first city in the United States to have a 50% recycling goal, and authored legislation to ban Styrofoam at fast food businesses, the first such legislation in the United States.

Environmental, educational, and political activism 
After serving on the City Council, Skinner served in leadership capacities for several nonprofit organizations concerning the environment. She co-founded ICLEI — Local Governments for Sustainability, a coalition of 800 global cities, and Cities for Climate Protection with 500 U.S. member cities, to assist urban regions with environmental and global warming policy, respectively. She was the U.S. director of The Climate Group, an international organization that works with businesses to address global warming. She also coauthored the best selling book series, Fifty Things You Can Do to Save the Earth and has written a pair of articles concerning global warming for the San Francisco Chronicle.

Skinner was an active member in the Parent-Teacher Association (PTA) and worked on a campaign to pass a parcel tax to fund Berkeley schools. She was Chair of the Berkeley School Enrichment Program Committee at Martin Luther King Jr. High School.

Skinner coordinated Loni Hancock's 2002 State Assembly campaign and was a Field Manager for Barbara Lee's 2002 Congressional campaign. She has worked for the campaigns of several local, state, and national democratic candidates, including presidential candidates Al Gore and John Kerry.

Recent political career 
Skinner was appointed to the East Bay Regional Park District board of directors in March 2006 to fill a vacancy due to the death of incumbent Jean Siri. She was appointed by a 6–0 vote and was selected over several other candidates for the position, including former Berkeley mayor Shirley Dean. Skinner was then elected to the board in 2006 with 84% of the vote. The district includes parts of Albany, Berkeley, El Cerrito, El Sobrante, Emeryville, Kensington, Richmond, San Pablo, Pinole & Oakland.

Skinner was considered a likely candidate for the California state Assembly as early as 2006 and had previously considered a run in 2002. She ultimately announced her candidacy in late January 2008. She defeated several opponents in the primary election; the most well-known of which included Richmond City Councilman Tony Thurmond, Berkeley City Councilman Kriss Worthington, and Berkeley resident Dr. Phil Polakoff. She was elected to the State Assembly in 2008 and re-elected in 2010 and 2012.

In 2016, Skinner ran for the California State Senate to replace Senator Loni Hancock, who was termed-out of office in 2016. Skinner won the June 2016 Primary Election by over 17%. The General Election for Senate District 9 took place on November 8, 2016. Skinner defeated Assemblyman Sandré Swanson and was elected to represent state Senate District 9. She was sworn into office on December 5, 2016.

In the 2017–2018 and 2019–2020 legislative sessions, she served as the Majority Whip of the state Senate. In the 2019 legislative session, she chaired the state Senate's Public Safety committee. In November 2020, Skinner won reelection to the Senate for another four-year term.

In the 2021-22 Legislative Session, Sen. Skinner chaired the Senate Budget and Fiscal Review Committee and the Joint Legislative Budget Committee, and she served on Senate Environmental Quality, Housing, Public Safety, and Transportation committees, along with the Joint Committee on Rules, the Joint Legislative Committee on Climate Change Policies, and the Committee on Revision of the Penal Code.

Legislation

Income equality 
Income Taxes on the Super Rich — AB 1130: Skinner pushed for legislation in 2011 that restored income tax rates on millionaires to the rate they were under Republican Governors Reagan and Wilson. The California Federation of Teachers fought for these tax rates to be in Proposition 30, which increased Proposition 30 revenue by over $2 billion a year.
Hungry Free Kids Act — AB 402: In 2011 Skinner passed a bill updating the CalFresh program. Children in the program live in households struggling to make ends meet. CalFresh can help struggling families have access to daily nutritious meals, yet thousands were not enrolled, the bill makes it easy for these families to be enrolled and receive the food assistance they need.
College Student Access to CalFresh — AB 1930: Skinner carried AB 1930 in 2014 to give college students who were previously not considered eligible to CalFresh programs better access to food assistance.
California Momnibus Act — SB 65: In 2021, Skinner authored SB 65, the California Momnibus Act, which included several legislative and budget strategies to reduce pregnancy and postpartum death rates and infant mortality, especially for families of color. It also improves research and data collection on racial and socio-economic factors that contribute to higher rates of maternal and infant mortality.

Ending corporate loopholes 
Internet Fairness — AB 155: Skinner pushed legislation to tax online sales that was approved in 2009 as part of the state budget. Governor Arnold Schwarzenegger vetoed the legislation. On January 19, 2011, Skinner introduced similar legislation in the form of AB153. The bill requires out-of-state online sellers with affiliates in California to collect sales tax on purchases made by state residents. The affiliate provision was included to ensure that only sellers with a California nexus are taxed, as required by federal law. "This legislation will close the current loophole in tax law which has allowed out-of-state companies to avoid collecting California sales and use tax," stated Skinner. Skinner estimated that AB153 could produce between $250 million and $500 million per year in new revenue. She and other supporters of the bill believe that the election of Jerry Brown to the governorship and support from retailers such as Barnes & Noble will help the measure become law.
Enforcing Workplace Safety — AB 1634: Skinner highlighted the dangerous conditions cited by California's workplace safety regulator that had to be fixed immediately, even if the employer appeals, so workers and communities aren't put at risk, passing AB 1634 to enforce workplace safety.

Education 
Childcare and PreSchool Expansion — 2014 Budget Bill: As Budget Chair Skinner facilitated the largest funding increase for early childhood education in over a decade, enabling the State to enroll thousands more children in preschool and quality childcare.
Higher Ed Funding While Halting Tuition Increases — 2014 Budget Bill: The University of California and California State University systems suffered huge recession cuts resulting in student tuition and fee increases. As Budget Chair Skinner worked for a larger state allocation to UC and CSU with language that would rescind the funds if UC/CSU increased student tuition.
Saving Energy Saving Schools — AB/SB 39: Schools spend millions of dollars each year on energy, Skinner's legislation, AB/SB 39, provided every California school district Proposition 39 funds to pay for energy upgrades, enabling the money saved on utility bills to go back into the classroom.
Fair Pay to Play Act—SB 206. In 2019, Skinner authored a landmark law that made California the first state in the nation to enact legislation allowing college athletes to earn money from the use of their name, image, and likeness (NIL). The law spurred other states to pass similar laws. In 2021, the NCAA followed California's lead and gave NIL rights to college athletes throughout the nation.
Fair Pay to Play Act II — SB 26: In 2021, Skinner authored a law that expanded on SB 206, the Fair Pay to Play Act, and moved up the implementation date to Sept. 1, 2021. SB 26 also allowed community college athletes to earn money from their name, image, and likeness.
Ending Willful Defiance Suspensions—SB 419. In 2019, Skinner authored a law that "prohibits willful defiance suspensions in grades four and five. It also bans such suspensions in grades six through eight for five years."
School Meals for All — In 2021, Sen. Skinner authored SB 364, School Meals for All. The bill's language was included in the 2021-22 California Budget Act, making California the first state in the nation to offer two free school meals a day to all public school students.

Criminal justice reform 
Foster Youth Detention — AB 2607: In 2014 Skinner called attention to the fact that foster children get stuck in detention longer just for the "crime" of not having a home, she wrote AB 2607 to stop the practice of using juvenile hall as a substitute for finding real homes for children.
Juvenile Justice — AB 999: Skinner wrote AB 999, which was included in the 2014 Budget Bill, in 2009 to fix the unfair system used to incarcerate youth. Guards in state juvenile facilities used "time-adds" to unfairly prolong the time youth were incarcerated. Within three years of stopping "time adds" the number of youth in state incarceration was cut in half.
Recidivism Reinvestment Fund — 2014 Budget Bill: As part of the 2014 budget bill Skinner saw that $100M was provided for community services to support reentry of our formerly incarcerated, required inmates be issued State IDs and be enrolled in MediCal prior to being released, and eliminated the lifelong ban imposed on those sentenced for non-violent drug crimes from ever accessing CalFresh or CalWorks.
SB394 — The bill was signed into law in October 2019. It allowed counties within the state to establish diversion programs for defendants who are primary caregivers of minors. It is supposed to reduce trauma for children would have otherwise had a parent incarcerated. The system in San Francisco allowed for defendants with misdemeanors and nonviolent charges to apply. The successful completion of the program would drop the charges against the defendant. The California District Attorney’s Association opposed the bill, citing potential loopholes for sex offenders.
Police Records—SB 1421: In 2018, Skinner authored a landmark law that made certain police records open to the public for the first time in four decades in California.
Police Records II — SB 16: In 2021, Skinner authored a new law that expanded on SB 142 to include other the types police records on officers with a history of biased or discriminatory behavior, unlawful arrests and searches, or excessive or unreasonable force.
Reforming Felony Murder—SB 1437: In 2018, Skinner also authored a groundbreaking law, reforming California's felony murder law so that people who don't actually commit murder can't be convicted of that crime.
Jury of Your Peers—SB 310: In 2019, Skinner authored a new law that will allow people with prior felony convictions to serve on juries in California.

Climate and environment 
Doubling Rooftop Solar — AB 560: Written by Skinner in 2009, AB 560 expanded net metering so that homes and businesses could get credit on their utility bills for the electricity produced by their rooftop solar.
Electricity from Renewable Energy — SB X1-2: Skinner's SB X1-2 bill set a 33% Renewable Portfolio Standard (RPS) requiring 33% of California's electricity to be generated from solar, wind, geothermal and other renewable energy by 2020.
Energy Storage — AB 2514: Energy storage captures extra electricity produced by wind, solar and other renewable energy. Skinner's bill, AB 2514, makes sure utilities use energy storage electricity when we need it.
Naming Eastshore State Park after Save the Bay Founder — AC 55: California's 8.5-mile (13.7 km) ribbon of parkland along the eastern side of San Francisco Bay is now named after Save the Bay co-founder Sylvia McLaughlin due to Skinner, a worthy recognition of her significant leadership.

Gun violence prevention 
Gun Violence Restraining Orders — AB 1014: Skinner saw that many instances of gun violence were preventable if the family was allowed to act when they saw one of their own show violent tendencies, as was the case with the Isla Vista Shooter. Her bill established a firearm restraining order so every family now has a tool to get guns out of the hands of those threatening violence.
Large-capacity magazines — AB 48: Skinner introduced AB 48, which made it illegal to manufacture, import, keep for sale, offer or expose for sale, or give, lend, buy, or receive any large capacity magazine conversion kit that is capable of converting an ammunition feeding device into a large-capacity magazine.

Housing 
Housing Accountability Act—SB 167: In 2017, Skinner authored this pivotal new law that increased the burden of proof that a local agency has to meet to deny a project, awards damages to plaintiffs if a local government is found to be acting in “bad faith,” and allows courts to leverage fines on cities that are not in compliance with the Housing Accountability Act. 
Transit-Rich Housing/Local Zoning Preemption — SB 827: In 2018, Skinner co-sponsored a sweeping bill to address the state's acute housing shortage by overriding local zoning laws to permit denser housing near mass transit and bus stops statewide. The bill failed to advance out of its first committee review.
Housing Crisis Act of 2019—SB 330: In 2019, Skinner authored a sweeping housing law that is designed to speed up the production of housing throughout California.
Homes for Homeowners, Not Corporations—SB 1079: In 2020, Skinner authored a law, reforming California's foreclosure law to prevent large corporations from buying up foreclosed homes in bulk at foreclosure auctions. The new law also gives tenants, families, cities and counties, and nonprofits a better opportunity to buy foreclosed homes.
AP News Quote: “I want to thank Moms 4 Housing for taking that house and for demonstrating that nowhere, nowhere should there be a vacant house anywhere in California when we have the housing crisis that we have,” said Democratic Sen. Nancy Skinner of Berkeley. “And it was totally legitimate for those homeless moms to take over that house.”

References

External links 

 
 California, low-carbon leader by Nancy Skinner
 "Green" work can grow corporate bottom lines by Nancy Skinner and Martin Uden
 Join California Nancy Skinner

Democratic Party California state senators
Democratic Party members of the California State Assembly
Women state legislators in California
California city council members
Politicians from Berkeley, California
Activists from the San Francisco Bay Area
UC Berkeley College of Natural Resources alumni
1954 births
Place of birth missing (living people)
Living people
Women city councillors in California
21st-century American politicians
21st-century American women politicians
UC Berkeley Graduate School of Education alumni